The Goa Women's League, also known as GFA Vedanta Women's League is the top division of women's football league in the Indian state of Goa. The League was first held in 2017 and is organised by the Goa Football Association (GFA), the official football governing body of the state.

Clubs

2022–23 season
The teams participating in the 2022–23 season:

Champions

See also 
Women's football in India

References

Women's football leagues in India
Football in Goa
Sports leagues established in 2017